The Jamaa' Ahlus Sunnah Bahamas Mosque is a mosque in Nassau, New Providence, The Bahamas.

History
The mosque was established in 1978 and is operated by Jamaat Management Consultancy Limited.

Architecture
It consists of three domes and one minaret.

See also
 Religion in the Bahamas

References

External links
 

1978 establishments in the Bahamas
Buildings and structures in Nassau, Bahamas
Islam in The Bahamas
Mosques completed in 1978
Mosques in North America
Religious buildings and structures in the Bahamas
Religious organisations based in the Bahamas